The Rhenish women's league (Rheinische Frauenliga) was an organisation set up by the Rheinische Volkspflege (Protectors of the Rhenish people) to bring together various primarily middle class women's organisations initially to campaign against the use of African troops by the French Army in the occupation of the Rhineland. The idea was initiated by a member of the Cologne-based Neven du Mont family and taken up by the civil servant Margarete Gärtner, who organised the first conference in Frankfurt am Main, 23–24 June 1920. The conference ratified her as the leader.

Constituent organisations
The league was composed of the following organisations in May 1921:
Katholischer Deutscher Frauenbund (Catholic Women's Federation)
Evangelischer Frauenbund
Israelitischer Frauenbund
Frauenausschuss der christlichen Gewerkschaften (Women's Committee of the Christian Unions)
Frauenausschuss der sozial-demokratischen Partei
Bund Deutscher Frauenvereine (League of German Women's Associations)
Rheinisch-Westf. Frauenverband
Bezirksausschuss f. Frauenarbeit
Verband Hessische Frauenvereine
Inter.-Kath. Verband  d. Frauenvereine i. Saargebeit
Stadtverband Düsseldorf
Verband Kölner Frauenvereine (Association of Cologne Women's Associations)
Kath. Frauenbund f. d. Pfalz
Verein f. Fraueninteressen u. Neustädter Frauenvereine
Allgemeiner deutscher Frauenverein Worms
Gesamtverband d. Frauenvereine d. Kreises Ottweiler
Stadtverband f. Jugendfürsorge Wiesbaden
Verein Frauenbildung-Frauenstudium
Verein d. kath. Sozialbeantinnen
Verein d. kath. Oberlehrerinnen
Verein d. kathkaufm. Gehilfinnen Köln
Verein d. kathkaufm. Gehilfinnen Weisbaden
Verein kath. Hausangestellten
Allgemeiner deutscher Lehrerinnen-verein
Verband d deutscher Reichs-Post-und Telegrafenbeamtinnen
Verband weibl. Handels-u.-Büroangestellten-Berlin
Stadtverband für Frauenbestrebungen
Kath. Jungfrauenvereine
Kath. Bahnhofsmission
Nationalverband d. kath. Mädchenschutzverein
Kath. Fürsorgeverein Speyer
Evangelischer Frauenhilfe Wiesbaden
Evangelischer Frauenhilfe Speyer
Verband Evangelischer deutscce Bahnhofsmission
Rheinische Frauenhilfe
Allgemeiner deutscher HausFrauenverein (Association of German Housewives)

References

Weimar Republic
Occupation of the Rhineland
Organizations established in 1920
1920 establishments in Germany
Women's organisations based in Germany